Klaidi Lolos (born 6 October 2000) is a Greek professional footballer of Albanian origin who plays as a striker for National League South club Oxford City. He has previously played for  club Plymouth Argyle where he had loan spells at Dorchester Town and Chippenham Town before joining Torquay United.

Club career

Early career
Lolos joined Plymouth Argyle in 2017 on a youth apprenticeship, having previously been at Crystal Palace. He was scouted by Argyle academy director Kevin Hodges whilst he was on trial at Birmingham City.

Lolos was part of the Argyle Youth team who performed well in the 2017–18 FA Youth Cup, notably beating Manchester City on penalties in the third round. Lolos opened the scoring in the fifth round against Fulham, but that was where Argyle's run ended as the match finished in a 3–1 loss after extra time.

On 15 December 2018, Lolos, along with teammate Aaron Goulty, was substituted off ill in an EFL Youth Alliance match against Portsmouth, which was being played in torrential conditions. The match was later postponed, after just 57 minutes had been played.

Plymouth Argyle
He first featured in a professional squad for Argyle in a 5–2 EFL League One defeat to Gillingham on 5 May 2018, where he appeared on the substitutes bench but did not come on.

He signed a professional contract ahead of the 2019–20 season. Lolos made his professional debut as a substitute in Argyle's 1–0 away defeat to Newport County on 17 August 2019. On 8 September 2020 he scored his first goal for Plymouth in an EFL Trophy tie against Norwich City U21s.

Lolos was released by Plymouth Argyle at the end of the 2020-21 season after making eight substitute appearances without scoring in League One and two starts in the Papa John's EFL Trophy where he scored one goal against Norwich City U21s.

Loan to Dorchester
In November 2019, Lolos joined Dorchester Town, of the Southern League Premier South on a two-month loan deal. He went on to play nine games for the Magpies, scoring four goals.

Loan to Chippenham Town
Lolos was loaned to Chippenham Town for one month in December 2020. He was sent off in his first and only game for the club and the loan was not extended.

Torquay United
Lolos was announced as a new signing for Torquay United on 19 July 2021. Lolos was released by the club after one season.

Oxford City
In July 2022, Lolos joined National League South club Oxford City having spent time with the club on trial.

International career
Having previously been invited on international training camps, on 12 February 2019 Lolos scored his first goal for the Greece U19 team, in a 2–0 friendly win against Romania.

References

External links

2000 births
Living people
Footballers from Athens
Greek footballers
Greece youth international footballers
Greek expatriate footballers
Greek people of Albanian descent
Greek expatriate sportspeople in England
Association football forwards
Plymouth Argyle F.C. players
Dorchester Town F.C. players
Chippenham Town F.C. players
Torquay United F.C. players
Oxford City F.C. players
English Football League players
Southern Football League players
National League (English football) players